The 2009 Swiss Figure Skating Championships took place between 4 and 6 December 2008 at the Patinoire du Littoral arena in La Chaux-de-Fonds Skaters competed in the disciplines of men's singles, ladies' singles, pair skating, and ice dancing on the senior and junior levels. The results were used to choose the Swiss teams to the 2009 World Championships and the 2009 European Championships.

The senior compulsory dance was the Paso Doble and the junior compulsory dance was the Starlight Waltz.

Senior results

Men

Ladies

Pairs

Ice dancing

Junior results

Ice dancing

External links
 2009 Swiss Figure Skating Championships 
 2009 Swiss Figure Skating Championships results

Swiss Figure Skating Championships
2008 in figure skating
Swiss Figure Skating Championships, 2009
Figure skating